Yuriy Vasilyevich Melnichenko (born 5 June 1972) is a Kazakh wrestler who won the gold medal in the Greco-Roman bantamweight (52–57 kg) category at the 1996 Summer Olympics. He competed at the next Olympics in the featherweight division and finished 19th.

After retiring from competing, Melnichenko worked as a wrestling coach. Between 2000 and 2004 he led the national team, and after that acted as vice-president of the national wrestling federation. Georgiy Tsurtsumia was his trainee.

References

External links
NBC Olympic Profile – Yuriy Melnichenko

1972 births
Living people
People from Jalal-Abad Region
Kyrgyzstani people of Ukrainian descent
Kazakhstani people of Ukrainian descent
Kyrgyzstani emigrants to Kazakhstan
Wrestlers at the 1996 Summer Olympics
Wrestlers at the 2000 Summer Olympics
Kazakhstani male sport wrestlers
Olympic wrestlers of Kazakhstan
Olympic gold medalists for Kazakhstan
Olympic medalists in wrestling
Asian Games medalists in wrestling
Wrestlers at the 1994 Asian Games
World Wrestling Championships medalists
Medalists at the 1996 Summer Olympics
Asian Games gold medalists for Kazakhstan
Medalists at the 1994 Asian Games